The Evelyn Moakley Bridge is a bridge that connects Downtown Boston to the Seaport District. It was named for the late wife of Congressman Joe Moakley on October 4, 1996, shortly after her death. At the eastern end of the bridge is the John Joseph Moakley Federal Courthouse and the Seaport Shrine.

References

Road bridges in Massachusetts
Transportation in Boston
Seaport District